Robert David "Dave" Grusin (born June 26, 1934) is an American composer, arranger, producer, jazz pianist, and band leader. He has composed many scores for feature films and television, and has won numerous awards for his soundtrack and record work, including an Academy Award and 10 Grammy Awards. In 1978, Grusin founded GRP Records with Larry Rosen, and was an early pioneer of digital recording.

Early life
Grusin was born in Littleton, Colorado, to Henri and Rosabelle (née de Poyster) Grusin. Grusin’s family originates from Gruzinsky princely line of the Bagrationi dynasty, the royal family that ruled the Kingdom of Georgia in the 9-19th centuries. In Slavic languages, "Grusin" is an ethnonym for Georgians.
 Grusin’s father, who was a violinist, was born and raised in Riga, Latvia, then part of the Russian Empire, from where he emigrated to the United States in 1913. Grusin's mother was a pianist. Grusin’s mother is of Jewish ancestry.

Grusin studied music at the University of Colorado at Boulder and received his degree in 1956. Grusin's teachers included Cecil Effinger and Wayne Scott, pianist, arranger and professor of jazz.

Career
Grusin produced his first single in 1962, "Subways Are for Sleeping", and his first film score, for Divorce American Style, in 1967. Other scores followed, including The Graduate (1967), Winning (1969), The Friends of Eddie Coyle (1973), The Midnight Man (1974), and Three Days of the Condor (1975).

In 1978, Grusin founded GRP Records with his business partner, Larry Rosen, and began to produce some of the first commercial digital recordings. Grusin was the composer for On Golden Pond (1981), Tootsie (1982), and The Goonies (1985). In 1988, he won the Oscar for best original score, for The Milagro Beanfield War. Grusin composed the musical signatures for the 1984 TriStar Pictures logo and the 1993 Columbia Pictures Television logo.

In 1998, Grusin ranked No. 5 and No. 8 on Billboards Top 10 Jazz Artists, at mid-year and at year's end, respectively, based on sales of his album, "Dave Grusin Presents West Side Story."

From 2000-11, Grusin concentrated on composing classical and jazz compositions, touring and recording with collaborators, including jazz singer and lyricist Lorraine Feather and guitarist Lee Ritenour. Their album Harlequin won a Grammy Award in 1985. Their classical crossover albums, Two Worlds and Amparo, were nominated for Grammys.

Grusin has a filmography of about 100 titles. His many awards include an Oscar for best original score for The Milagro Beanfield War, as well as Oscar nominations for The Champ, The Fabulous Baker Boys, The Firm, Havana, Heaven Can Wait, and On Golden Pond. He received a Best Original Song nomination for "It Might Be You" from the film Tootsie. Six of the fourteen cuts on the soundtrack from The Graduate are his. Other film scores Grusin has composed include Where Were You When the Lights Went Out?, Three Days of the Condor, The Goonies, Tequila Sunrise, Hope Floats, Random Hearts, The Heart Is a Lonely Hunter, Mulholland Falls and The Firm. He composed the original opening fanfare for film studio TriStar Pictures.

Grusin composed theme music for the TV programs Good Morning World (American TV series) (1967), It Takes a Thief (1968), The Name of the Game (1968), Dan August (1970), The Sandy Duncan Show (1971–72), Maude (1972), Good Times (1974), Baretta (1975), St. Elsewhere (1982), and, for Televisa in Mexico, Tres Generaciones (1987). He composed music for individual episodes of each of those shows. Grusin's other TV credits include The Wild Wild West (1966), The Girl from U.N.C.L.E. (1966), and Columbo: Prescription: Murder (1968). He composed and performed the theme song for One Life to Live (1968) during the 1984/1985 seasons. Grusin wrote the music for the This Is America, Charlie Brown episode "The Smithsonian and the Presidency", and two of the cues from the episode "History Lesson" and "Breadline Blues" (the latter covered by Kenny G) appear on the tribute album Happy Anniversary, Charlie Brown.

In 1994, GRP was in charge of MCA's jazz operations. Founders Grusin and Rosen left in 1995 and were replaced by Tommy LiPuma. In 1997, Grusin and Rosen founded N2K Encoded Music, which was renamed N-Coded Music.

Grusin received honorary doctorates from Berklee College of Music in 1988 and University of Colorado, College of Music in 1989. Grusin was initiated into the Beta Chi Chapter of Phi Mu Alpha Sinfonia at the University of Colorado in 1991.

Personal Life

Dave Grusin has been married to Nan Newton for many years and has three adult children, Scott Grusin, Michael Grusin, and Stuart Grusin. He is also the stepfather of Nan's adult daughter, Annie Vought. Grusin is the subject of a 2018 feature-length documentary entitled “Dave Grusin: Not Enough Time.”

Awards and honors
Over a 15-year period from 1979 to 1994, Grusin won one Academy Award, and received a further 7 nominations. In total, he has been nominated for 38 Grammy Awards, and won on 10 occasions.

Academy Awards 
Winner, Music (Original Score): The Milagro Beanfield War (1989)
Nomination, Music (Original Score):  Heaven Can Wait (1979), The Champ (1980), On Golden Pond (1982), The Fabulous Baker Boys (1990), Havana (1991),  The Firm (1994)
Nomination, Music (Original Song): "It Might Be You" (1983), with Alan and Marilyn Bergman

Grammy Awards

Winner, Best Original Score Written For A Motion Picture Or A Television Special: The Graduate (1968), shared with Paul Simon.
Winner, Best Arrangement on an Instrumental: Summer Sketches '82 (1982), "Early A.M. Attitude" (1986), "Suite" for The Milagro Beanfield War (1990), "Bess You Is My Woman/I Loves You Porgy" (1991), "Mood Indigo" (1993), "Three Cowboy Songs" (1994)
Winner, Best Instrumental Arrangement Accompanying Vocals: "My Funny Valentine" by Michelle Pfeiffer (1989), "Mean Old Man" by James Taylor (2002)
Winner, Best Album Original Score Written for Motion Picture or Television:  The Fabulous Baker Boys (1989)
Nomination, Best Original Score: Selena

Golden Globe Awards
Nomination, Best Original Score: The Milagro Beanfield War (1988), The Fabulous Baker Boys (1989), Havana (1990), For the Boys (1991)

Other
Charles E. Lutton Man of Music Award, Phi Mu Alpha Sinfonia, 1991
AFI's 100 Years of Film Scores (Best American Film Scores of all Time voted by the American Film Institute): #24 for On Golden Pond

Discography

As leader 
Subways Are for Sleeping (Epic, 1962)
Piano, Strings, and Moonlight (Epic, 1962)
Kaleidoscope (Columbia, 1964)
Divorce American Style (United Artists, 1967) – soundtrack
The Graduate (Columbia, 1968) – soundtrack recorded in 1967
The Heart is a Lonely Hunter (Film Score Monthly, 1968) - soundtrack
The Ghost & Mrs. Muir (1968 - 1970) – TV series
Candy (Epic, 1969) – soundtrack
Three Days of the Condor (DRG/EMI, 1975) – soundtrack
Discovered Again! (Sheffield Lab, 1976)
Don't Touch (Versatile, 1977)
One of a Kind (GRP, 1977)
Heaven Can Wait (Kritzerland, 1978) - soundtrack
The Champ (Varèse Sarabande, 1979) – soundtrack
Mountain Dance (GRP, 1979) - AUS #100
The Electric Horseman (Varèse Sarabande, 1979) – soundtrack
Dave Grusin Presents GRP All-Stars Live in Japan (JVC, 1980)
On Golden Pond (Varèse Sarabande, 1981) - soundtrack
Out of the Shadows (Arista-GRP, 1982)
Tootsie (Film Score Monthly, 1982) - soundtrack
Night-Lines (GRP, 1983)
Dave Grusin and the NY-LA Dream Band (GRP, 1984)
Racing with the Moon (Kritzerland, 1984) - soundtrack
The Pope of Greenwich Village (Quartet Records, 1984) - soundtrack
Harlequin with Lee Ritenour (GRP, 1985)
The Goonies (Varèse Sarabande, 1985) - soundtrack
Lucas (Varèse Sarabande, 1986)
Cinemagic (GRP, 1987)
GRP Live in Session (GRP, 1988)
Sticks and Stones (with Don Grusin) (GRP, 1988)
Migration (GRP, 1989)
The Fabulous Baker Boys (GRP, 1989)
A Dry White Season (Kritzerland, 1989) - soundtrack
The Bonfire of the Vanities (Atlantic, 1990)
Havana (GRP, 1990)
The Gershwin Connection (GRP, 1991)
GRP Super Live in Concert (GRP, 1992)
Homage to Duke (GRP <GRD-9715>, 1993)
The Firm (MCA-GRP <MGD-2007>, 1993)
Dave Grusin Presents GRP All-Star Big Band Live! (GRP 97402, 1993)
The Orchestral Album (GRP, 1994)
The Cure (GRP, 1995)
Two for the Road (GRP, 1996)
Mulholland Falls (Cinerama, 1996) - soundtrack
Selena (Angel, 1997)
West Side Story (N-Coded, 1997)
Hope Floats (RCA Victor, 1998) - soundtrack
Random Hearts (Sony, 1999)
Two Worlds with Lee Ritenour (Decca, 2000)
Dinner with Friends  (Jellybean, 2001)
Now Playing (GRP, 2004)
Amparo (Decca, 2008)
The Girl from U.N.C.L.E. (Varèse Sarabande, 2008)
An Evening with Dave Grusin (Heads Up, 2010)
One Night Only! (C.A.R.E./Intergroove, 2011)

As sideman 

With Patti Austin
 Havana Candy (CTI, 1977)
 Love Is Gonna Getcha (GRP, 1990) – rec. 1989

With the Brothers Johnson
 Look Out for#1 (A&M, 1976)
 Right on Time (A&M, 1977)

With Tom Browne
 Browne Sugar (GRP, 1979)
 Love Approach (GRP, 1980) – rec. 1979-80
 Magic (Arista, 1981)

With Don Grusin
 10k-LA (JVC, 1981)
 Native Land (GRP, 1993)
 The Hang (Sovereign, 2004)

With Quincy Jones
 You've Got It Bad Girl (A&M, 1973)
 Body Heat (A&M, 1974)
 Mellow Madness (A&M, ,1975)
 I Heard That!! (A&M, 1976)
 Roots (A&M, 1977)

With John Klemmer
 Touch (ABC, 1975)
 Barefoot Ballet (ABC, 1976)

With Earl Klugh
 Earl Klugh (Blue Note, 1976)
 Living Inside Your Love (Blue Note, 1976)
 Finger Paintings (Blue Note, 1977)

With Jon Lucien
 Rashida (RCA, 1973)
 Mind's Eye (RCA, 1974)
 Song for My Lady (Columbia, 1975)

With Harvey Mason
 Marching in the Street (Arista, 1976)
 Funk in a Mason Jar (Arista, 1977)
 With All My Heart (Bluebird, 2004)

With Carmen McRae
 I Am Music (Blue Note, 1975)
 Can't Hide Love (Blue Note, 1976)

With Sergio Mendes
 Homecooking (Elektra, 1976)
 Sergio Mendes & the New Brasil '77 (Elektra, 1977)

With Gerry Mulligan
 Little Big Horn (GRP, 1983)
 Dragonfly (Telarc Jazz, 1995)

With Lee Ritenour
 First Course (Epic, 1976)
 Gentle Thoughts(JVC 1977)
 Captain Fingers (Epic, 1977)
 Friendship (Jasrac, 1978)
 The Captain's Journey (Elektra, 1978)
 Rio (JVC, 1979)
 Feel the Night (Discovery, 1979)
 On the Line (GRP, 1983)
 Earth Run (GRP, 1986)
 Festival (GRP, 1988)
 World of Brazil (GRP, 2003)
 Overtime (Peak, 2005)
 Smoke 'N' Mirrors (Peak, 2006)
 Rhythm Sessions (Concord, 2012)
 A Twist of Rit (Concord, 2015)

With Diane Schuur
 Deedles (1985)
 Timeless (1986)

With James Taylor
 October Road (Columbia, 2002)
 A Christmas Album (Hallmark Cards, 2004)
 James Taylor at Christmas (Columbia, 2006)

With Dave Valentin
 Legends (Arista GRP, 1978)
 The Hawk (GRP, 1979)
 Flute Juice (GRP, 1983)
 Kalahari (GRP, 1984)

With Sarah Vaughan
 A Time in My Life (Mainstream, 1972)
 Sarah Vaughan with Michel Legrand (Mainstream, 1972)

With Sadao Watanabe
 My Dear Life (Flying Disk, 1977)
 California Shower (Flying Disk, 1978)
 Morning Island (Flying Disk, 1979)
 How's Everything (Columbia, 1980)[2LP] – live
 Orange Express (CBS/Sony, 1981)
 Encore! (Victor, 2016)

With others
 George Benson, 20/20 (Warner Bros., 1985) – rec. 1984
 Angela Bofill, Angel of the Night (Arista, 1979)
 Ray Brown, Brown's Bag (Concord Jazz, 1976)
 Bobby Broom, Clean Sweep (Arista GRP, 1981)

 Judy Collins, Home Again (Elektra, 1984)
 Eddie Daniels, Blackwood (GRP, 1989)
 Kevin Eubanks, Face to Face (GRP, 1986)
 Art Farmer, Crawl Space (CTI, 1972)
 Eric Gale, Part of You (Columbia, 1979)
 Gordon Goodwin's Big Phat Band, Act Your Age (Immergent, 2008)
 Lesley Gore, Love Me by Name (A&M, 1976)
 Jay Hoggard, Days Like These (GRP, 1979)
 Al Jarreau, We Got By (Reprise, 1975)
 Billy Joel, 52nd Street (Columbia, 1978)
 Chaka Khan, ck (Warner Bros., 1988)
 Peggy Lee, Let's Love (Atlantic, 1974)
 Bette Midler, For the Boys (Atlantic, 1991) – soundtrack
 Melba Moore, Peach Melba (Buddah, 1975)
 Alphonse Mouzon, The Man Incognito (Blue Note, 1976) – rec. 1975
 Noel Pointer, Phantazia (Blue Note, 1977)
 The Rippingtons, Curves Ahead (GRP, 1991)
 Howard Roberts, Equinox Express Elevator (Impulse!, 1972)
 Phoebe Snow, Against the Grain (CBS, 1978)
 Donna Summer, Donna Summer (Geffen, 1982) – rec. 1981–82
 Grover Washington Jr., A Secret Place (Kudu, 1976)
 Nancy Wilson, This Mother's Daughter (Capitol, 1976)
 Bill Withers, Making Music (Columbia, 1975)

Filmography

See also
List of music arrangers
List of jazz arrangers

Notes

References

External links

Music video sampler: 
Dave Grusin on Sound of Cinema, interviewed by Matthew Sweet. BBC Radio, 21 November 2020
Performances of Dave Grusin's piano music

1934 births
Living people
20th-century American composers
20th-century American conductors (music)
20th-century American Jews
20th-century American male musicians
20th-century American pianists
21st-century American composers
21st-century American conductors (music)
21st-century American Jews
21st-century American male musicians
21st-century American pianists
American film score composers
American jazz pianists
American male conductors (music)
American male film score composers
American male jazz musicians
American male pianists
American male songwriters
American music arrangers
American people of Latvian descent
American television composers
Best Original Music Score Academy Award winners
Epic Records artists
Grammy Award winners
GRP All-Star Big Band members
GRP Records artists
Jazz musicians from Colorado
Jewish American film score composers
Jewish American television composers
Male television composers
People from Littleton, Colorado
Smooth jazz pianists
Songwriters from Colorado
University of Colorado alumni